Jorge Clemente (born 24 November 1993) is a Spanish actor. He is best known for his performance as Manu in La pecera de Eva and as  Carlos "Carlitos" Terán in Seis Hermanas.

References

External links 

1993 births
Living people
Spanish male film actors
Male actors from Madrid
21st-century Spanish male actors